Aloysius "Alo" Creevey is a fictional character from the third generation of the British teen drama Skins. He is portrayed by Will Merrick. He appears in the fifth and sixth series of the show.

Characterisation
Alo lives on a farm in the outskirts of Bristol with his domineering mother, Catherine, hen-pecked father, Owen, and their incoherent farmhand, Dewi, who disapprove of his lifestyle. While they call him "Aloysius," he is frequently referred to by the shortened version of his name, "Alo", although Mini affectionately nicknames him "Farm boy." He is obsessed with pornography, claiming that he can "guess the nationality of any homemade porn without turning the sound up," and is in possession of some Victorian pornography. He describes his likes as "my van, my weed, my dog." He is best friends with Rich Hardbeck.

Merrick stated in an interview that he had initially auditioned for the part of Rich, but that he had been "put in with the quirky-looking people." He has commented on Alo's naivety repeatedly in interviews, saying "He blocks out all the trauma of life and thinks he can be free and happy all the time and that he doesn't have to take any responsibility,"  and that, in his second centric episode, "he almost goes from getting everything wrong and making all the wrong decisions to possibly understanding the way things are."

While initially portrayed as a frustrated, sex-obsessed virgin in the fifth series, Alo's sixth series sees him struggling with an "on-again, off-again" relationship with Mini, after she decided to take his virginity in the opening episode. The two eventually have a child together, which they name Grace, after their deceased friend.

Synopsis

Series 5

In "Franky", Alo and Rich witness Franky's dramatic entrance into Roundview College, on a motorised scooter, and immediately see her as a fellow outcast. They later approach her at lunchtime, but are promptly chased off by Mini, who hopes to make peace with Franky after a fight they had on the hockey pitch. The next day, when Nick posts embarrassing pictures of Franky on the school walls, Alo and Rich attempt to warn her, but are unsuccessful and she is humiliated. Later on, they attempt to get into Mini's birthday party, but are quickly outmatched by the security guard at the door, and ejected. Despite this, the two conspire with Grace to kidnap Franky, whom they take to a swimming pool in Alo's van (which he obtained the right to drive over the summer), where they bond as a group of their own.

In "Rich", Alo becomes frustrated with Rich constantly getting in between him and girls, and attempts to persuade him to find a girlfriend. Although Rich scoffs at this idea, Alo soon tracks down a potential love interest for Rich - female metalhead who works in the library. Seeing that he needs help learning how to interact with girls, Alo seeks the help of Grace, who knows more about girls than Franky. Later, when the girl in the library turns out to be as shallow as the girls Rich despises, and he turns down Grace's request to date him, Alo remonstrates him in the van, and the two get into an argument, before Rich storms off. The two reconcile later, after Rich realises that he needs to be open-minded about the girls he would like to date.

In "Liv", Alo and his friends are invited over to Liv's house by Mini, who hopes to make amends with them. After accepting their apologies, Alo withdraws a large bag of weed and declares that nobody will leave the house until it's been smoked. He and the group spend most of the episode high in Liv's house, before being kicked out by an angry Liv after a fight with Mini.

In "Nick", Alo's desperation to find a girlfriend has increased, and the gang are seen attempting to think of a girl he could date. Nick suggests he date Franky, which causes discomfort amongst the group, not the least because Matty agrees, to Franky's dismay.

In "Alo", Alo's domineering mother and hen-pecked father are introduced. It is demonstrated that they are often cruel to him (though his father merely does so because he is scared of his wife), forbidding him to go out and party with his friends until after he has had a tractor driving lesson. Additionally, his mother frequently tells him how disappointed she is in him. His father secretly allows him to go early, but when his mother finds out, she informs him that they are planning to pull him out of school in order to force him to buckle down on the farm. Despite the gang's efforts to persuade him to stand up to them, he is unable to do so. Later, Alo accidentally kills the family cow by dropping his spliff onto a propane canister. This prompts his mother to confiscate all of his possessions, including his van and dog and she and his father take them off to be sold, despite his pleas.

Alo finally hits his breaking point, and decides to get revenge by destroying the one thing his family loves - the farm. He immediately calls his friends over for an egg and flour fight, effectively destroying the farm's entire produce. He then organises an impromptu party, which trashes the farmhouse. When his family return, they are confronted with a crowd of teenagers leaving, and are aghast to find the farm completely wrecked. A drunken Alo angrily lashes out at them, particularly his father for allowing his mother to pick on him, calling him "gormless and old." The shock is too much for his father, who suffers a heart attack. Alo's mother panics and tells him to call an ambulance. Wracked with guilt, he confesses to Mini at a party at Nick's house, and she consoles him. He is unable to get help from Rich, but is reassured by his family farmhand that his father is fine, and that they did not actually sell Alo's belongings. When Alo returns home, he receives the usual harsh response from his mother, but for once, stands up for himself. Later, Alo reconciles with his father.

In "Everyone", Alo is tasked with driving the gang to a church in Somerset, where Rich and Grace intend to marry. Alo neglects to bring a map, and they get lost in the woods. To make matters worse, the van breaks down, and there is no phone signal. Grace and Rich hitch a ride with an elderly couple going to the town where they intend to marry, and Liv, Matty and Franky go off on their own, as does Mini, when she becomes frustrated with Alo's poor planning. Alo and Nick bond over drinks, and Alo rescues Nick from a rabbit snare. They eventually make it to the church, but not before Grace's father, David Blood, arrives. Nick persuades David to let them get on with it, however.

Series 6

In "Everyone", Alo joins the gang for a holiday in Morocco. After injuring himself by jumping into an empty swimming pool, he steals an iPhone at the party of a wealthy British drug dealer named Luke. Mini, fresh from a shower after finally finding a way to turn the water on, enters his room, and finds him attempting to download a pornography app on the phone he stole. Mini suggests he try having sex in real life, and as Alo scoffs, she suddenly kisses him passionately, and tells him that she is going to take his virginity, but makes him swear to secrecy, on pain of death. The two then have sex. Though it was meant to be a one-time event, the two form a friends-with-benefits relationship.

In "Rich", Alo attempts to help Rich take his mind off the comatose Grace, whom her father has forbidden him from seeing, by forming a band with him. However, Rich is unable to take his mind off Grace, and breaks into the Bloods' home. Days later, Alo comes knocking with a bag of weed, and the two squat at the house together with a baggie of marijuana. However, Rich's temper is frayed when Mini turns up to have sex with Alo. After the two have an argument about it, Rich makes a harsh comment about Alo to his face, prompting the two to engage in a fistfight. Eventually, to raise money to get the gang to France, Alo organises a house gig for their band, which goes down well, but ultimately is unsuccessful, when Blood returns home and tearfully informs Rich that Grace had died the day before.

In "Alex," Alo is punched in the face by Alex, who had rolled a dice telling him to "punch the next person to enter the room," just as Alo had entered the canteen. He is even more confused when Alex immediately apologises for it. Alo does not immediately forgive Alex for the punch, but gradually warms up to him.

In "Mini", Alo is having sex with Mini in a nightclub toilet, when he accidentally shouts out that he loves her, which alarms her. When he turns up at her house to apologise, she tells him that he can either have sex with her or leave. When confronted with her mother's new boyfriend, however, she insists that he stay, and sleep on the floor. However, she neglects to tell him that she is pregnant with his baby. Later on in the episode, he becomes jealous when he sees Mini flirting with her father, Gregory's assistant, at a work function, and the two have a confrontation, leading to Alo fighting with Gregory's assistant and getting thrown out. Mini turns up at his farm to reconcile with him, but he coldly informs her that he is fed up with the way she treats him, and brushes her off.

In "Alo", he pursues a relationship with Poppy Champion, a girl who flirted with him at a nightclub. The next day, the two go out to a nearby forest to have a picnic together. There, the two form a relationship, and, after she persuades him to dance with her to Martin Solveig's "Hello" in their underwear, the two proceed to have sex upstairs. However, during the act, Alo notices several childish toys and posters lining the walls and furniture, and then spots a school uniform hanging on the wardrobe. Upon recognising the crest on the jacket, he stops the sex at once and demands to know how old Poppy is. When she reveals that she is almost 14, he is horrified that he is now technically a child molester, particularly upon realising Poppy is too immature to realise the legal implications of what they were doing. He narrowly escapes Poppy's house, avoiding her argumentative parents. Later, Alo attempts to break up with Poppy, but only at her fourteenth birthday. In retaliation, Poppy goes to the police. Alo is arrested in the middle of a school exam and charged with statutory rape, and suspended from school. Rich later bails him out, but no one is sympathetic to him, mostly due to his inability to say the right thing.

Alo attempts to call Poppy to negotiate with her, but is caught by her aggressive father, who angrily threatens him over the phone. He runs away from home and lives rough at a nearby playground (theorising that this would be the last place the authorities would look). Realising that Mini is the root of his troubles, he goes to confront her. Mini suggests that he had sex with Poppy because she was the same mental age as him, and orders him to leave, but he manages to get through to her, telling her that he doesn't like her as she's behaving. Alo continues to live rough and ponders running away, before being found by Dewi, his family farmhand, who gives him food and informs him that his family is worried for him. He offers him money if he does want to run away, but Alo decides to stay, grow up and resolve his issues. He goes to Poppy's home to meet with her family, and Poppy claims that she had lied to the police to get back at Alo for breaking up with her. Her parents immediately begin arguing, and Alo, seeing that this is the root of Poppy's issues, silences them, before refuting Poppy's lie and admitting that they had had sex without his knowledge about her age. He is promptly beaten up by her father and thrown out. The next day, Mini comes to his farm, planning to tell him about her pregnancy. Before she can do so, however, Alo receives a call from Poppy, who informs him that her parents have split up, and her mother had forced her father to drop the charges against him, threatening to report him for beating Alo up. The two part on good terms, but when Alo finishes the call, he finds Mini has left.

In "Mini and Franky", after Mini is rushed to hospital, Alo enters her hospital room, and finally finds out that Mini is pregnant with his baby. He is devastated that he was the last to know, and breaks down in tears in the hospital waiting room, while Liv attempts to console him. Alo initially doesn't want the baby, but over time, gradually warms to the idea of being a father. At the end, Mini returns to his farm, and the two share a kiss, and finally form a relationship. However, their joy does not last, when Mini discovers blood running down her leg.

In "Finale", Alo is taking care of Mini, who is in hospital. He manages to get the doctor to give her permission to go out for an end-of-year party. The next morning, Mini suddenly suffers contractions, and is rushed back to hospital, where she gives birth to a baby girl, which they are largely presumed to have named Grace, with Alo and Liv by her side.

References

Television characters introduced in 2011
Skins (British TV series) characters
Fictional English people
Fictional farmers
Fictional cannabis users
Male characters in television
Teenage characters in television
Fictional teenage parents
British male characters in television